Route 212 is a two-lane east/west highway in the Estrie region in the province of Quebec, Canada. It begins in the city of Cookshire at a junction with Route 108 and runs through Newport, La Patrie and Notre-Dame-des-Bois before reaching its terminal at Route 161 in the village of Woburn.

Municipalities along Route 212

 Cookshire-Eaton
 Newport
 La Patrie
 Notre-Dame-des-Bois
 Saint-Augustin-de-Woburn

Major intersections

See also
 List of Quebec provincial highways

References

External links 
 Official Transport Quebec Road Map
 Route 212 in Google Maps

212